Luka Nyeh Yusuf   (22 September 1952 – 2 June 2009) was a Nigerian army lieutenant general who served as Chief of Army Staff (COAS) from 2007 to 2008. He succeeded Owoye Andrew Azazi as Chief of Army Staff.

Education & background
Yusuf was born on September 22, 1952 in Bara-Kagoma, Kaduna State. He attended the Nigerian Defence Academy (NDA) and was commissioned as a 2nd Lieutenant into the Nigerian Army Artillery Corps in 1975 and was a member of the Nigerian Defence Academy (NDA) Course 14.  Others in his NDA class were officers such as former Chief of Defence Staff, Air Chief Marshal Paul Dike

Career
Yusuf served as Commander of the Nigerian military contingent to United Nations Mission in Sierra Leone (UNAMSIL) before being appointed in 2006 as Commander in Charge of the  Armed Forces of Liberia by Liberian President Ellen Johnson Sirleaf. Upon Yusuf's appointment as Nigeria's Chief of Army Staff by President Umaru Yar Adua in 2007, Liberia's President awarded General Yusuf with Liberia's Honor of Distinguished Service. He will always be remembered for his contributions in the area of bringing peace to the troubled Niger Delta Region where he described the militants as misguided children. He said that though the Nigerian Army has the wherewithal to deal with the militants, it was better for the nation to take the path of dialogue than confronting the militants in an all out offensive.

He also said all soldiers had the right to sue the army if they felt they had been slighted in any way and if any judgment was given in favour of the complainants, the army would abide by any court ruling.

His words, “I am a fulfilled man, we have been able to achieve monumental feats because, compared to the last 30 years, the difference in the last one year has been immense. We set the Army on a transformation path, we beefed up training, Eagle Ex-Ring 1V 2007 and NADCEL 2008 is an attestation to this fact. In addition to several unit level trainings, preparations are currently on for others now. My appeal, however, is that the maintenance of our equipment should not be compromised.’’ 

He said, “we were 101 that got admission into NDA in 1973; only 67 came through two years later. Today, 28th of August 2008, I am the last man standing among the 14th Regular Course. I am an extremely fulfilled man. I am proud to have tasted battles and commanded the Nigerian Army, the pride of every soldier”.

Yusuf was very particular about the welfare of his men. “Never in the history of the Army have barracks been renovated enblock as five barracks are slated for renovation, meaning that in four years, all Army barracks in the country would have been renovated. We also made sure that our troops on peace support operations get their full allowances as stipulated by the United Nations. It has never happened before”.

He also launched the Barracks Youth Foundation for the upliftment of the teeming youngsters in the barracks.

He also cherished the transformation of the Army and he put so much energy into the realisation of that dream.

Death
Yusuf died in London on June 2, 2009 after a protracted illness at the age of 56

References

1952 births
2009 deaths
Chiefs of Army Staff (Nigeria)
Nigerian Army officers
Nigerian generals
Nigerian Defence Academy alumni